The Lieberose forced labor camp was a Nazi forced labor camp situated near the village of Lieberose in Brandenburg, Germany. It was a subcamp of Sachsenhausen concentration camp, near Cottbus.

Near the end of the war, Jewish prisoners were sent on a death march towards Sachsenhausen.

A mass grave, containing the bodies of hundreds of victims of the Nazis, has been found near the site of the camp. The mass grave is believed to be the largest mass grave in Germany which was not itself within a concentration camp.

References 

Sachsenhausen concentration camp